Grand Targhee Resort is a ski resort in the western United States, located in western Wyoming in the Caribou-Targhee National Forest, near Alta, the closest town to the resort. The border with Idaho is less than five miles (8 km) due west.

The resort has lodging, a spa, retail stores, and conference facilities.

Activities 
The ski resort has four quad-chairs (two are high-speed detachable), and one conveyor. It is rated as 85% Difficult and 15% Advanced in skiing. There are also Nordic skiing trails, snowshoeing, snowcat adventures, and activities.

The reason for the abundant snowfall is twofold.

The resort has two terrain parks as of January 2016.

Summertime offers scenic chairlift rides, kids camps, music festivals, a bluegrass festival, and 70+ miles of crosscountry and downhill bike trails. Grand Targhee is also in close proximity to Yellowstone National Park.

History
The original inhabitants of this area were the Shoshone, Bannock, Blackfoot, and Crow tribes. The Teton Range was called the Tee-Win-At by the Shoshone Indians, meaning "high pinnacles".

Targhee or Chief Targhee by 1867, was known as, “the great head chief of all the Bannock people.” He led his people through what may have been the grimmest period of their history as they were forced from their traditional nomadic ways and into a life of hard labor and farming on the newly created Fort Hall Reservation. Chief Targhee was truly a great chief admired for his strong character and integrity. He was honored by euro-Americans and Native-Americans alike. He held the peace while his people suffered from starvation and abuse resulting from the shameful acts of both the United States and Idaho Territorial governments. He was killed while hunting for food by the Crow in the winter of 1871/72. Upon his death, the Bannock fractured into several bands bent on war with the euro-Americans that eventually led to the demise of a significant proportion of the Bannock.

Grand Targhee Resort's name includes both a reference to Grand Teton Mountain and Chief Targhee. A national forest, a mountain pass, a creek, a dog and the resort commemorate Chief Targhee's integrity and the memory of the Native American contribution to this country.

Ski resort
The locals of Teton Valley were instrumental in establishing Grand Targhee Resort. In 1966, Grand Targhee, Inc. was formed by east Idahoans.  One of the goals of the 900+ members was to benefit the community and the economy of the region.  The resort opened  on December 26, 1969, with the Bannock and Shoshone lifts, Targhee Lodge, and day lodge.  The resort was officially dedicated by Idaho Governor Don Samuelson six weeks later on February 2, 1970.

The original plan never materialized.

Prior to its fourth ski season, Grand Targhee was purchased in October 1973 by Bill Robinson, a plastics manufacturer from Cincinnati. Though primarily an absentee owner, Robinson and his family loved the area, bought a home in Driggs, and visited frequently throughout the years.

In 1987, Grand Targhee Resort was purchased and operated by Mory and Carol Bergmeyer. The Bergmeyers improved the resort facilities, added new guest activities and expanded the reputation of Targhee while continuing its dedication to family, quality and the sensitive balance between people and the great outdoors. In 1988, the Bergmeyers changed the resort's policy to allow snowboards on the hill. In March 1990, the Rendezvous day lodge was destroyed by fire.

Booth Creek Ski Holdings, Inc., a corporation run by CEO George Gillett, Jr., purchased Grand Targhee in March 1997. In June 2000, George and Rose Gillett, along with their four sons, purchased Grand Targhee from Booth Creek Ski Holdings.

In 1997, the resort's first high-speed detachable quad chair, Dreamcatcher, replaced Bannock, and the Shoshone double chair was replaced with a fixed-grip quad. Through a land exchange in 2004, the Gilletts acquired ownership of Grand Targhee's base area. Planning has begun for the future development of Grand Targhee Resort including an expansion of Peaked Mountain facilities and a proposed expanded base area with more lodging units. In the summer of 2016, the Blackfoot double chair was torn down to make way for the new Blackfoot highspeed quad chairlift.

Stick of Truth 

The Stick of Truth is a snow depth indicator at the resort, first installed in November 2018.

Unlike snow condition data from SNOTEL, the Truth gauge is simple and non-electronic—except for night lighting.  It consists of a  measuring stick (calibrated in inches) on a platform to accumulate snowfall, and a webcam.  The platform is cleared of snow and ice daily so that the gauge shows snow depth delivered in the last (up to) 24 hours.

Since its inception, the platform often has few whimsical plastic figurines from a collection of hundreds.

The webcam shows a live view and is available on the resort's Snow Report page,
the See Jackson Hole website, as well as on YouTube.

References

External links 
 
 Travel Wyoming - official site - Grand Targhee Resort
 Visit Idaho - official site - Grand Targhee
 First Tracks Online.com - Grand Targhee

Ski areas and resorts in Wyoming
Golf clubs and courses in Wyoming
Buildings and structures in Teton County, Wyoming
Tourist attractions in Teton County, Wyoming